2022 Czech Lion Awards ceremony was held on 4 March 2023.

Categories
Nominations were announced on 16 January 2023 with Arvéd receiving 12 nominations while Il Boemo received 11 nominations and Banger 8 nominations. Il Boemo' has won 6 awards including Best film award. The ceremony was notable for success of television projects in other categories than Best Television Film or Miniseries and Best TV Series.

Non-statutory Awards

References

Czech
Czech Lion Awards ceremonies